Bolshoye Mitenino is a rural locality (a village) in Nikolskoye Rural Settlement, Sheksninsky District, Vologda Oblast, Russia. The population was 31 as of 2002.

Geography 
Bolshoye Mitenino is located 3 km east of Sheksna (the district's administrative centre) by road. Maloye Mitenino is the nearest rural locality.

References 

Rural localities in Sheksninsky District